West Main–North Chesnutt Streets Historic District is a national historic district located at Clinton, Sampson County, North Carolina.  The district encompasses 44 contributing buildings in a predominantly residential section of Clinton.  It developed between about 1830 to the early 1930s, and includes notable examples of Greek Revival, Colonial Revival, and Gothic Revival architecture.  Notable buildings include the Richard Clinton Holmes House (pre 1826), Amma. F. Johnson House (1868), Dr. William G. Micks House (1851), William Hubbard House (c. 1865), R. H. Hubbard, Sr. House (c. 1870), St. Paul's Episcopal Church (1902), L. C. Graves Presbyterian Church (1908), C. B. Barrus House (1923), the Hathcock-Hobbs House (c. 1925), the Gabe Barbrey House (1932), and the F. L. Turlington House (1937).

It was added to the National Register of Historic Places in 1986.

References

Historic districts on the National Register of Historic Places in North Carolina
Colonial Revival architecture in North Carolina
Greek Revival architecture in North Carolina
Gothic Revival architecture in North Carolina
Buildings and structures in Sampson County, North Carolina
National Register of Historic Places in Sampson County, North Carolina